"That's the Thing about Football" is a song written and performed by Australian artist Greg Champion, featured for almost a decade on Seven Network's coverage of the Australian Football League.

Released in 1994, the song reached a peak of number 31 on the Australian ARIA Charts and is widely regarded as a classic in mainstream Australian sporting culture.

External links
That's the Thing About Football

1994 songs
Australian rules football songs